The 1984 Pontins Professional was the eleventh edition of the professional invitational snooker tournament which took place in May 1984 in Prestatyn, Wales.

The tournament featured eight professional players. The quarter-final matches were contested over the best of 9 frames, the semi-final matches over the best of 13 frames, and the final over the best of 17 frames.

Willie Thorne won the event, beating John Spencer 9–7 in the final.

Main draw

References

Pontins Professional
Snooker competitions in Wales
Pontins Professional
Pontins Professional
Pontins Professional